Michael Gale (born 1966) is a former Australian rules football player who played in the VFL/AFL between 1985 and 1993 for the Fitzroy Football Club and then from 1994 to 1998 for the Richmond Football Club.

His five seasons for the Tigers were played alongside his younger brother, Brendon.  Their father, Don Gale, was a champion Tasmanian footballer who became the first player from the NWFU to achieve All Australian selection.  Their grandfather, Jack Gale, played three games for Richmond in 1924.

References 

 Hogan P: The Tigers of Old, Richmond FC, Melbourne 1996

External links
 

1966 births
Living people
Richmond Football Club players
Fitzroy Football Club players
Tasmanian State of Origin players
Australian rules footballers from Tasmania
Penguin Football Club players
Tasmanian Football Hall of Fame inductees
Allies State of Origin players